Shocking Asia is a 1974 mondo documentary film written and directed by Rolf Olsen with Ingeborg Stein Steinbach. The film was however banned in Finland due to its graphic content. A sequel titled Shocking Asia II: The Last Taboos was released in 1985.

Content 
As with most other films of similar nature (such as Faces of Death and Traces of Death), Shocking Asia does not follow a traditional narrative structure, instead neglecting plot for images and video footage of bizarre and macabre situations such as animal cruelty, strange rituals, footage of deformed children and a sex change operation. Most of the clips used are claimed to be real, although this has yet to be verified.

References

External links

1974 films
Mondo films
1974 documentary films
Hong Kong documentary films
German documentary films
1970s English-language films
1970s German films
1970s Hong Kong films